Paul Mainieri (born August 29, 1957) is a former baseball coach and second baseman. He played college baseball at LSU, Miami-Dade CC and New Orleans before pursuing a professional baseball career. He then served as the head coach of the St. Thomas Bobcats (1983–1988), the Air Force Falcons (1989–1994), the Notre Dame Fighting Irish (1995–2006) and the  LSU Tigers (2007–2021). Mainieri coached LSU to the 2009 College World Series Championship.

Playing career
Mainieri graduated from Christopher Columbus High School in Miami.  He started his college baseball playing career in 1976 at LSU.  He played for one season, earning a letter, before transferring to Miami-Dade North Community College to play for his father, Demie Mainieri. After one year he transferred to the University of New Orleans where he played for two years and helped the team win two Sun Belt Conference titles and earn an appearance in the 1979 NCAA Division I baseball tournament. In 1978, he played collegiate summer baseball with the Wareham Gatemen of the Cape Cod Baseball League, and was named a league all-star.

Mainieri completed his undergraduate degree requirement at Florida International University in 1980, earning a B.S. in physical education.  He played two years of minor league baseball and earned a M.S. in sports administration from St. Thomas University in 1982.

Coaching career

St. Thomas
Mainieri began his coaching career in Florida as the head coach of St. Thomas University in 1983. In six seasons, his team went 179–121–2, and Mainieri became the winningest coach in St. Thomas History.  His No. 1 jersey was retired by the university in February 2012. In 2013, the new field at St. Thomas University was named in his honor. The Bobcats' new field is called Paul Demie Mainieri Field at Frank R. Esposito Stadium. Paul Mainieri asked the university to include his middle name, Demie, in the naming of the field because it is the same name as his father's first name.  Both Mainieris have deep roots with St. Thomas, and recently became the first father-son duo to be elected to the American Baseball Coaches Association Hall of Fame.

Mainieri was inducted into the St. Thomas Hall of Fame on November 1, 2009.  Mainieri became the sixth person to be inducted into the St. Thomas Hall of Fame, joining Ken Stibler, Marinka Bisceglia, Manny Mantrana, Laura Courtley-Todd and John Batule.

Air Force
He moved on to the United States Air Force Academy in 1989, where he would also remain for six seasons. He became the second-winningest coach in Air Force history posting a mark of 152–158.

Notre Dame
Moving to the Notre Dame Fighting Irish in 1995, Mainieri turned the Fighting Irish into a perennial postseason contender winning the Big East tournament a record 5 straight seasons, making the NCAA Tournament 9 out of 12 seasons, and leading the Irish to one College World Series appearance in 2002.  He won the 2001 Big East Coach of the Year award. In total, Mainieri posted a .714 winning percentage going 533–213–3 in twelve seasons.

LSU
Mainieri replaced Smoke Laval at the end of the LSU Tigers' 2006 season. In the 2007 season, LSU finished 29–26–1 and did not reach the NCAA Tournament.

40 games into the 2008 season, the Tigers were again struggling with a 23–16–1 record. However, the team then went on a Southeastern Conference record 23-game win streak and moved on to claim the 2008 SEC Tournament Championship. Under Mainieri's leadership, the team swept the Baton Rouge Regional bracket of the NCAA baseball post-season and won their first Super-Regional since 2004. UC Irvine ended the streak in the first game of the Super Regional, defeating LSU 11–5, but LSU won the next two games and reached the 2008 College World Series. It was LSU's first College World Series appearance since 2004 and they recorded their first win since their CWS championship in 2000.

Mainieri's Tigers entered the 2009 season as the favorites to win the SEC, and were the preseason No. 1 team in some national polls. During the season, the Tigers won the SEC regular season title, the 2009 SEC Tournament Championship, and reached the  2009 College World Series as the No. 3 national seed. Mainieri then led LSU to the CWS Finals against Texas. The Tigers won the first game 7–6 in 11 innings, lost the second 5–1, but won the national championship defeating the Longhorns 11–4 in the final game. The Tigers finished the season with a 56–17 record.  Mainieri received the 2009 Coach of the Year award from Collegiate Baseball Newspaper and the 2009 Coach of the Year award by Baseball America. Rivals.com also named Mainieri the 2009 National Coach of the Year.

The 2009 title was the sixth in LSU baseball history, tying Texas for the second most national championships in college baseball history, and Mainieri joined Skip Bertman as the only LSU baseball coaches to win a national championship.

In 2015, Mainieri received the National Coach of the Year award from the National Collegiate Baseball Writers Association and the Skip Bertman Award presented by the College Baseball Foundation. During the 2017 season, LSU played Florida in a best-of-three series to determine the winner of the 2017 College World Series. Florida defeated LSU and the Tigers finished as College World Series runner-up.

Head coaching record

NCAA tournament

See also
List of college baseball coaches with 1,100 wins

References

External links
 LSU profile
 

1957 births
Living people
Baseball second basemen
Baseball coaches from Florida
Air Force Falcons baseball coaches
Florida International University alumni 
Miami Dade Sharks baseball players
LSU Tigers baseball coaches
LSU Tigers baseball players
Notre Dame Fighting Irish baseball coaches
St. Thomas Bobcats baseball coaches
St. Thomas University (Florida) alumni 
New Orleans Privateers baseball players
Niagara Falls Pirates players
Sportspeople from Morgantown, West Virginia
Baseball players from Miami
Sports coaches from Miami
Wareham Gatemen players
Christopher Columbus High School (Miami-Dade County, Florida) alumni